Boucekastichus is a genus of wasps in the family Eulophidae.

References

Key to Nearctic eulophid genera
Universal Chalcidoidea Database 

Eulophidae